The Daytime Emmy Awards, or Daytime Emmys, are part of the extensive range of Emmy Awards for artistic and technical merit for the American television industry. Bestowed by the New York-based National Academy of Television Arts and Sciences (NATAS), the Daytime Emmys are presented in recognition of excellence in American daytime television programming. The first ceremony was held in 1974, expanding what was originally a prime time-themed Emmy Award. Ceremonies generally are held in May or June.

History

The first Emmy Award ceremony took place on January 25, 1949. The first daytime-themed Emmy Awards were given out at the Primetime Emmy Awards ceremony in 1972, when The Doctors and General Hospital were nominated for Outstanding Achievement in a Daytime Drama. That year, The Doctors won the first Best Show Daytime Emmy. In addition, the award for Outstanding Achievement by an Individual in a Daytime Drama was given to Mary Fickett from All My Children. A previous category "Outstanding Achievement in Daytime Programming" was added once in 1968 with individuals like Days of Our Lives star Macdonald Carey nominated. Due to voting rules of the time, judges could opt to either award one or no Emmy, and in the end they decided that no one nominated was deserving of the golden statuette. This snub outraged then-Another World writer Agnes Nixon, causing her to write in The New York Times, "...after viewing the recent fiasco of the Emmy awards, it may well be considered a mark of distinction to have been ignored by this group."

Longtime General Hospital star John Beradino became a leading voice to have daytime talent honored with special recognition for their work. The first separate awards show made just for daytime programming was broadcast in 1974 from the Channel Gardens at Rockefeller Center in New York. The hosts that year were Barbara Walters and Peter Marshall. For years, the gala was held in New York, usually at nearby Radio City Music Hall, with occasional broadcasts from Madison Square Garden. In 2006, the Daytime Emmys was moved to the Kodak Theatre in Los Angeles, the first time they had ever been held outside of New York. The Kodak Theatre also hosted the 2007 and 2008 ceremonies, before it was moved again in 2009 to the Orpheum Theatre across town. In 2010 and 2011, the Daytime Emmys were instead held in Las Vegas. From 2012 onward, the Daytime Emmys have been held at various venues in Los Angeles, never to return again to New York (most likely as a reflection of the current state of American daytime dramas, where all New York-produced network soap operas have since been cancelled, and the ones left on the air are being recorded in Los Angeles).

Due to the relatively small talent pool in daytime television, it has become common for the same people to be nominated repeatedly. The most infamous of these is All My Children star Susan Lucci, whose name became synonymous with being nominated for an award and never winning, after having been nominated 18 times without receiving an award before finally winning a Daytime Emmy for Best Actress in 1999.

In 2003, in response to heavy criticism of bloc voting in favor of shows with the largest casts, an additional voting round was added to all the drama acting categories. Known as the "pre-nominations", one or two actors from each show is selected to then move on and be considered for the primary nominations for the awards.

With the rise of cable television in the 1980s, cable programs first became eligible for the Daytime Emmys in 1989. In 2013, in response to All My Children being moved from broadcast to streaming television, NATAS began accepting nominations to web-only series. The Academy of Television Arts & Sciences (ATAS) also began accepting original online-only streaming television programs in 2013.

In October 2019, as part of several initiatives regarding gender identity, the NATAS decided to replace both the younger actor and actress in a drama categories with a single gender-neutral one for 2020.

The 47th Daytime Emmy Awards were postponed to June 26, 2020, due to the COVID-19 pandemic, with the traditional in-person ceremony being replaced by a television special featuring remote appearances, and the announcement of winners in leading categories.

In December 2021, the ATAS and NATAS announced major realignments to the Emmy Awards, accounting for the growth of streaming services by aligning their categories and the ceremonies' scopes around factors such as the themes and frequency of such programming, rather than dayparts. This resulted in most dramas (besides soap operas) now falling exclusively under the scope of the Primetime Emmy Awards, and categories for children's television being spun out into the newly-established Children's and Family Emmy Awards.

Rules
Among the Daytime Emmy rules, a show must originally air on American television during the eligibility period between January 1 and December 31. Historically, in order to be considered a national daytime show, the program was required to air between 2 a.m. and 6 p.m., and to at least 50 percent of the country. Shows in syndication, whose air times vary between media markets, could either be entered in the Daytime or Primetime Emmys (provided they still reach the 50 percent national reach), but not in both. Game shows that reached the 50 percent threshold could be entered into the Daytime Emmys if they normally aired before 8 p.m.; otherwise, they were only eligible for the Primetime Emmys.   

Web television shows, must be available for downloading or streaming to more than 50 percent of the country, and like shows in syndication they can only enter in one of the national Emmy competitions. A show that enters into the Daytime Emmys cannot also be entered into the Primetime Emmy Awards or any other national Emmy competition. Entries must be submitted by late December. Most award categories also require entries to include DVDs or tape masters of the show. For example, most series categories require the submitted DVD to include any one or two episodes that originally aired during the eligibility period. 

Voting is done by peer judging panels. Any active Academy member, who has national credits for at least two years and within the last five years, is eligible to be a judge. Depending on the category, voting is done using either a ratings score criteria or a preferential scoring system. 

As of the 49th edition, eligibility for the Daytime Emmy Awards is now based on factors such as thematics and broadcasting frequency, with certain categories having been moved to other Emmy presentations. In particular: 

 Only daytime serial dramas—defined as an episodic, multi-camera drama that airs on a weekday basis, or a reboot or spin-off of such a series—are eligible for drama awards at the Daytime Emmy Awards. All other scripted comedies and dramas now fall under the ATAS and Primetime Emmy Awards, regardless of scheduling.
 Programming targeting viewers aged 15 and younger were spun out into the new Children's and Family Emmy Awards, also organized by the NATAS.
 Talk shows are divided between the Daytime and Primetime Emmy Awards based on "format and style characteristics reflective of current programming in the daytime or late night space".
 Categories for game shows and instructional/do it yourself (DIY) programming remained split between the Daytime and Primetime Emmy Awards for 2022, pending realignment in 2023.
 Categories for morning shows were moved to the News & Documentary Emmy Awards.

Telecast
The show originally aired during the daytime hours (except for the 1983 and 1984 awards, which weren't televised) but moved to primetime in 1991. For many years, the show was produced by one of its own Lifetime Achievement honorees, Dick Clark. Each show from 2006 to 2008 was produced by White Cherry Entertainment.

NBC often aired special primetime episodes of its soaps (such as Another World: Summer Desire) as a lead-in to the ceremony. In 2002, 2005, and 2007, CBS aired special primetime editions of The Price Is Right as a lead-in (the first of which tying into its then-host Bob Barker being host of the ceremony, and the last being a primetime encore of his final episode as host, which aired earlier in the day).

In August 2009, The CW broadcast the Daytime Emmys for the first time, due to the other networks declining to carry it (at the time the network did have one daytime program, Judge Jeanine Pirro). The airing delivered the ceremony's lowest ratings ever (0.6/2 in 18–49, 2.72m), but it did outperform The CW's weak averages on the night that summer. The second time around, Associated Television International brought the 37th Daytime Emmy Awards to CBS, as well as the 38th, the following year. On May 3, 2012, it was announced and confirmed that HLN would air the 39th ceremony on June 23, 2012. In that ceremony, an additional non-Emmy award was awarded by the program's social media partner, AOL, for Best Viral Video Series. With 912,000 viewers (not counting four repeat broadcasts which brought the total to 2 million), the broadcast was "the most watched regularly scheduled, non-news telecast" ever on HLN, but by far the least-watched Daytime Emmy ceremony ever.

For the first time in the event's four-decade history, the 2014 Daytime Emmy ceremony was not broadcast on TV and instead aired only online, but the Daytime Awards telecast eventually returned to television the following year thanks to a two-year deal with basic cable channel Pop. However, for 2016, the Academy announced that ceremony would not be televised for the second time, citing the "current climate for awards shows".

In 2020, the remotely-produced "virtual" ceremony for the 47th Daytime Emmy Awards aired on CBS, marking its return to both broadcast TV and CBS for the first time since 2011. On April 1, 2021, the NATAS subsequently announced a two-year deal with CBS, covering the 48th and 49th Daytime Emmy Awards.

Award categories

Daytime Emmys
Daytime Emmys are awarded in the following categories:

Programming
 Outstanding Drama Series
 Outstanding Talk Show
 Outstanding Legal/Courtroom Program
 Outstanding Culinary Program
 Outstanding Entertainment News Program

Acting
 Outstanding Lead Actor in a Drama Series
 Outstanding Lead Actress in a Drama Series
 Outstanding Supporting Actor in a Drama Series
 Outstanding Supporting Actress in a Drama Series
 Outstanding Younger Performer in a Drama Series
 Outstanding Guest Performer in a Drama Series

Hosting
 Outstanding Talk Show Host
 Outstanding Culinary Host

Writing/Directing
Directing for a Drama Series
Writing for a Drama Series

Daytime Creative Arts Emmys
Creative Arts Emmy Awards are awarded in the following categories:

Art Direction
 Art Direction/Set Direction/Scenic Design for a Drama or Daytime Fiction Program 
 Art Direction/Set Decoration/Scenic Design for a Series

Casting
 Casting for a Drama or Daytime Fiction program

Costumes
 Costume Design for a Drama Series
 Costume Design/Styling for a Series

Directing
 Directing in a Lifestyle/Culinary/Travel Program
 Directing in a Talk Show/Morning Program
 Special Class Directing

Editing
 Multiple Camera Editing for a Drama Series
 Multiple Camera Editing for a Series
 Single Camera Editing for a Series

Hairstyling
 Hairstyling for a Drama Series
 Hairstyling for a Series

Lighting Direction
 Lighting Direction for a Drama Series
 Lighting Direction for a Series

Main Title and Graphic Design

Makeup
 Makeup for a Drama Series
 Makeup for a Series

Music
 Music Direction and Composition for a Drama Series
 Music Direction and Composition for a Series
 Original Song – Drama
 Original Song for a Series
 Original Song – Main Title and Promo

Performance
 Host in a Lifestyle/Travel Program

Programming
 Outstanding Lifestyle Program
 Outstanding Special Class Series
 Outstanding Special Class Special
 Outstanding Special Class – Short Format Daytime Program
 Outstanding Travel Program

Promotional Announcement
 Promotional Announcement – Episodic
 Promotional Announcement – Institutional

Sound Editing and Mixing
 Live and Direct to Tape Sound Mixing for a Drama Series
 Live and Direct to Tape Sound Mixing
 Sound Mixing and Editing for a Drama or Daytime Fiction Program
 Sound Mixing and Sound Editing
 Sound Editing – Live Action
 Sound Mixing – Live Action

Stunt Coordination

Technical Direction
 Single Camera Photography
 Technical Team for a Drama Series
 Technical Team for a Series

Writing
 Special Class Writing

Retired categories 

Programming
 Outstanding Children/Youth/Family Special (1974–2007)
 Outstanding Children's Animated Program
 Outstanding Pre-School Children's Animated Program
 Outstanding Children's Series
 Outstanding Pre-School Children's Series
 Outstanding Special Class Animated Program
 Outstanding Digital Daytime Drama Series (2011–2021)
 Outstanding Game Show (1974–2022)
 Outstanding Morning Program (2007–2021)

Acting
 Outstanding Younger Actor in a Drama Series (1985–2019)
 Outstanding Younger Actress in a Drama Series (1985–2019)

Hosting
 Outstanding Game Show Host (1974–2022)

Casting
 Casting for an Animated Series or Special
 Casting for a Children's Program

Directing
 Directing in an Animated Program
 Directing in a Preschool Animated Program
 Directing in a Children's Series
 Directing Team for a Daytime Fiction Program
 Voice Directing for an Animated Series
 Directing in a Game/Audience Participation Show (removed in 2006)
 Directing in a Game Show (2015–2020)

Editing
 Editing for an Animated Program
 Editing for a Preschool Animated Program

Individual Achievement in Animation

Music
 Music Direction and Composition for a Preschool, Children's or Animated Program
 Original Song in a Children's, Young Adult or Animated Program
 Original Song for a Preschool, Children's or Animated Program

New Approaches
 New Approaches – Enhancement to a Daytime Program or Series
 New Approaches – Original Daytime Program or Series

Performance
 Performer in a Children/Youth/Family Special (1989–2007)
 Outstanding Musical Performance in a Daytime Program (2016–2019)
 Performer in an Animated Program
 Performer in a Preschool Animated Program
 Performer in a Children's Series
 Younger Performer in a Children's Program

Sound Editing and Mixing
 Film Sound Editing (1985–1995)
 Film Sound Mixing (1985–1995) 
 Sound Editing (1996–2002)
 Sound Mixing (1996–2002)
 Sound Editing – Special Class (1996–2002)
 Sound Mixing – Special Class (1996–2002)
 Sound Editing – Live Action or Animation (2003–2011)
 Sound Mixing – Live Action or Animation (2003–2011)
 Sound Mixing and Sound Editing for a Animated Program
 Sound Mixing and Sound Editing for a Preschool Animated Program
 Sound Editing – Animation
 Sound Editing for a Preschool Animated Program
 Sound Mixing – Animation
 Sound Mixing for a Preschool Animated Program

Writing
 Writing in an Animated Program (1992–1994, 2009–2021)
 Writing in a Children's Series
 Writing in a Preschool Animated Program

Spanish programming/talent
 Outstanding Morning Program in Spanish
 Outstanding Entertainment Program in Spanish
 Outstanding Daytime Talent in Spanish

Ratings

See also
 List of American television awards
 List of Daytime Emmy Award winners (soap operas only)
 List of Primetime Emmy Award winners

References

External links

 
 Daytime Emmy Pre-Nominations
Soapdom.com's Daytime Emmy Site

 
Awards established in 1974
1974 establishments in the United States
Lifetime achievement awards
American annual television specials